Sumter & Choctaw 102 is a preserved 2-8-2 steam locomotive at the National Railroad Museum in Green Bay, Wisconsin. It spent its career on the Sumter & Choctaw Railway and was retired in 1962 and donated to the National Railroad Museum.

In the 1980s, the tender of the locomotive was replaced with a tender equipped with two diesel engines, therefore becoming a moving display. In 2007, one of the diesel engines was replaced with a more powerful engine so that it can now pull trains.

References

External links
Photo and video

2-8-2 locomotives
Baldwin locomotives
Culture of Green Bay, Wisconsin
Standard gauge locomotives of the United States
Railway locomotives introduced in 1924
Preserved steam locomotives of Wisconsin